Ralph Benson (16 June 1773 - 23 October 1845) was an English politician.

Biography
He was educated at Manchester Grammar School.

Benson was one the first mixed-race Member's of Pariament of the Parliament of the United Kingdom and served as the Tory MP for Stafford from 1812 to 1818 and again from 1826 to 1830.

Benson's father, Moses Benson, was a West Indies merchant and slave trader, whilst his mother, Judith Powell, was a free mustee.

References

See also 

 List of ethnic minority politicians in the United Kingdom
1773 births
1845 deaths
British people of Jamaican descent
UK MPs 1812–1818
UK MPs 1826–1830
18th-century British politicians
Black British MPs
Black British politicians
Conservative Party (UK) MPs for English constituencies